This article summarizes the highlights of professional and amateur golf in the year 2011.

Men's professional golf
Major championships
7–10 April: The Masters – South African Charl Schwartzel won his first major title with a two stroke margin over Australians Adam Scott and Jason Day.
16–19 June: U.S. Open – Northern Irishman Rory McIlroy won with an eight stroke victory over Australian Jason Day for his first major win.
14–17 July: The Open Championship – Northern Irishman Darren Clarke won his first major championship by three strokes over Americans Dustin Johnson and Phil Mickelson.
11–14 August: PGA Championship – American rookie Keegan Bradley won his first major championship in his first major start, beating Jason Dufner in a three-hole playoff.

World Golf Championships 
23–27 February: WGC-Accenture Match Play Championship – Englishman Luke Donald won his first WGC tournament, beating German Martin Kaymer 3&2.
10–13 March WGC-Cadillac Championship – American Nick Watney won his first WGC tournament with a two-stroke margin over compatriot Dustin Johnson.
4–7 August: WGC-Bridgestone Invitational – Adam Scott won his first WGC tournament by four strokes over Luke Donald and Rickie Fowler.
3–6 November: WGC-HSBC Champions – Martin Kaymer won his first WGC tournament by three strokes over Swede Freddie Jacobson.

FedEx Cup playoff events – see 2011 FedEx Cup Playoffs
25–28 August: The Barclays – Dustin Johnson won by two strokes over defending champion Matt Kuchar. The tournament was shortened to 54 holes in anticipation of Hurricane Irene.
2–5 September: Deutsche Bank Championship – Webb Simpson won on the second hole of a sudden-death playoff over Chez Reavie.
15–18 September: BMW Championship – Justin Rose won by two stroke over John Senden.
22–25 September: Tour Championship – Bill Haas won on the third playoff hole over Hunter Mahan.

Other leading PGA Tour events 
12–15 May: The Players Championship – South Korea's K. J. Choi defeated American David Toms on the first playoff hole to claim the title.

For a complete list of PGA Tour results see 2011 PGA Tour.

Leading European Tour events
26–29 May: BMW PGA Championship – Englishman Luke Donald defeated compatriot and World Ranking Number 1 Lee Westwood on the first playoff hole to claim the title and become the new World Ranking Number 1.
8–11 December: Dubai World Championship – Álvaro Quirós of Spain eagled the 72nd hole to claim a two shot victory over Paul Lawrie.

For a complete list of European Tour results see 2011 European Tour.

Team events
7–9 January: Royal Trophy – Team Europe defeated Team Asia 9–7 for its second consecutive win and fourth in the event's five editions.
15–18 September: Vivendi Seve Trophy – Team Great Britain and Ireland defeated team Continental Europe, 15½ to 12½, for the sixth consecutive time.
17–20 November: Presidents Cup – The American team defeated the International team 19–15. It was the fourth consecutive win in this event for the Americans. 
24–27 November: Omega Mission Hills World Cup – The American team of Matt Kuchar and Gary Woodland won giving the United States their 24th win in the World Cup.

Tour leaders
PGA Tour –  Luke Donald (US$6,683,214)
 This total does not include FedEx Cup bonuses.
European Tour –  Luke Donald (€5,323,400)
 This total includes the US$1.5 million (€1,107,174) bonus for winning the Race to Dubai.
Japan Golf Tour –  Bae Sang-moon (¥151,078,958)
Asian Tour –  Juvic Pagunsan (US$788,299)
PGA Tour of Australasia –  Greg Chalmers (A$554,285)
Sunshine Tour –  Garth Mulroy (R3,464,463)
OneAsia Tour –  Andre Stolz (US$464,812)

Awards
PGA Tour
FedEx Cup – Bill Haas won the FedEx Cup after winning the Tour Championship in a playoff over Hunter Mahan. 
PGA Player of the Year –  Luke Donald
Player of the Year (Jack Nicklaus Trophy) –  Luke Donald
Leading money winner (Arnold Palmer Award) –  Luke Donald
Vardon Trophy –  Luke Donald
Byron Nelson Award –  Luke Donald
Rookie of the Year –   Keegan Bradley
Comeback Player of the Year – None
Payne Stewart Award –  David Toms
European Tour
Golfer of the Year –  Luke Donald
Rookie of the Year –  Tom Lewis
Nationwide Tour
Player of the Year –  J. J. Killeen

Other tour results
 2011 Asian Tour
 2011 PGA Tour of Australasia
 2011 Canadian Tour
 2011 Challenge Tour
 2011 Japan Golf Tour
 2011 Nationwide Tour
 2011 OneAsia Tour
 2011 Sunshine Tour
 2011 Tour de las Américas

Other happenings
27 February – Martin Kaymer became the new world Number 1 succeeding Lee Westwood after finishing second in the WGC-Accenture Match Play Championship. He was the first German World number 1 after Bernhard Langer.
12 April – The Sunshine Tour announced that it will host a new World Golf Championships tournament starting in 2012. The event, to be called the Tournament of Hope, is expected to be played in December and is planned to have a purse of US$10 million, the richest in the sport.
24 April – Lee Westwood replaced Martin Kaymer as world Number 1 after winning the Indonesian Masters on the Asian Tour. 
30 May – Luke Donald became the new world Number 1 after winning the BMW PGA Championship, by defeating former world Number 1 Lee Westwood on the first hole of the playoff.
4 December – Tiger Woods won the unofficial event he hosts, the Chevron World Challenge, chasing down Zach Johnson with birdies on the final two holes. This was his first professional tournament win since his 2009 sex scandal.

Women's professional golf
LPGA majors
31 March – 3 April: Kraft Nabisco Championship – American Stacy Lewis defeated defending champion and current world number one Yani Tseng by three strokes to claim her first professional win.
23–26 June: Wegmans LPGA Championship – Yani Tseng from Taiwan won by 10 strokes over American Morgan Pressel. It was Tseng's third LPGA Tour win in 2011 and her seventh professional win of the year. If was also Tseng's fourth career major win, which made her the youngest golfer, male or female, in the modern era to win four majors.
7–10 July: U.S. Women's Open – So Yeon Ryu of South Korean defeated compatriot Hee Kyung Seo in a three-hole playoff. It was Ryu's first win in an LPGA Tour event.
28–31 July: Ricoh Women's British Open – Yani Tseng defended her title with a four-stroke win over American Brittany Lang. The win made Tseng the youngest player ever, male or female, to win five major championships.

Ladies European Tour major (in addition to the Women's British Open)
21–24 July: Evian Masters – Ai Miyazato of Japan won her seventh LPGA Tour title with a two-stroke victory over American Stacy Lewis.

For a complete list of Ladies European Tour results see 2011 Ladies European Tour.

Additional LPGA Tour events 
17–20 December: CME Group Titleholders – South Korean Hee Young Park claimed her first win on LPGA Tour with two stroke margin over Sandra Gal and Paula Creamer.

For a complete list of LPGA Tour results, see 2011 LPGA Tour.

Team events 
23–25 September: Solheim Cup – Europe reclaimed the Cup by a score of 15–13. It was the first win for Europe since 2003 and Europe's fourth victory in the 12-tournament history of the Solheim Cup.

Money list leaders
LPGA Tour –  Yani Tseng (US$2,921,713)
LPGA of Japan Tour –  Ahn Sun-ju (¥127,926,893)
Ladies European Tour –  Ai Miyazato (€363,079.68)
LPGA of Korea Tour –  Kim Ha-Neul (₩524,297,417)
Ladies Asian Golf Tour –  Yani Tseng (US$62,550)
ALPG Tour –  Kristie Smith (A$60,033) (2010/11 season)
LPGA Futures Tour –  Kathleen Ekey (US$66,412)

Awards
LPGA Tour Player of the Year –  Yani Tseng
LPGA Tour Rookie of the Year –  Hee Kyung Seo
LPGA Tour Vare Trophy –  Yani Tseng
LET Player of the Year –  Caroline Hedwall
LET Rookie of the Year –  Caroline Hedwall

Other tour results
2011 LPGA Futures Tour
2011 Ladies Asian Golf Tour
2011 LPGA of Japan Tour
2011 LPGA of Korea Tour

Other happenings
 14 February – Yani Tseng moved to number one in the Women's World Golf Rankings, surpassing Jiyai Shin who had held the position for the previous 15 weeks. Tseng's move to number one came after winning back-to-back events in Australia on the ALPG Tour and Ladies European Tour.
 26 June – After winning the LPGA Championship for her fourth career major, 22-year-old Yani Tseng became the youngest player, male or female, in the modern era to win four majors.
 20 July – The LPGA announced that the Evian Masters will become that tour's fifth major starting in 2013. The tournament will move to September, becoming the season's last major, and would be renamed "The Evian". (The tournament would later be slightly renamed as "The Evian Championship".)
 18 September – 16-year-old Lexi Thompson won the Navistar LPGA Classic, becoming the youngest player to win an LPGA tournament. She broke the previous record for multi-round tournament that was set by 18-year-old Paula Creamer in 2005.

Senior men's professional golf
Senior majors
5–8 May: Regions Tradition – American Tom Lehman defeated Australian Peter Senior on the second playoff hole to claim his third Champions Tour title of the season and second career senior major.
26–29 May: Senior PGA Championship – American Tom Watson defeated countryman David Eger on the first playoff hole to claim his sixth career senior major. The 61-year-old Watson also became the oldest winner of a senior major since the creation of the Champions Tour in 1980.
21–24 July: The Senior Open Championship – American Russ Cochran won his first senior major, finishing two shots clear of fellow American Mark Calcavecchia.
28–31 July: U.S. Senior Open -American Olin Browne won his first senior major by three shots over countryman Mark O'Meara.
18–21 August: Senior Players Championship – American Fred Couples won his first senior major, defeating countryman John Cook on the third playoff hole.

Full results
2011 Champions Tour
2011 European Senior Tour

Money list leaders
Champions Tour – American Tom Lehman topped the money list for the first time with earnings of US$2,081,526.
European Senior Tour – Australian Peter Fowler led the Order of Merit with earnings of €302,327.

Awards
Champions Tour
Charles Schwab Cup –  Tom Lehman
Player of the Year –  Tom Lehman
Rookie of the Year –  Kenny Perry
Comeback Player of the Year –  Chip Beck
Leading money winner (Arnold Palmer Award) –  Tom Lehman ($2,081,526)
Lowest stroke average (Byron Nelson Award) –  Mark Calcavecchia (69.04)

Amateur golf
17–21 May: NCAA Division I Women's Golf Championships – UCLA won its third team championship. Austin Ernst of LSU won the individual title.
31 May – 5 June: NCAA Division I Men's Golf Championships – Augusta State successfully defended its team championship, with LSU's John Peterson winning the individual title.
13–18 June: The Amateur Championship – Bryden Macpherson became the first Australian in over 50 years to win The Amateur, beating Scotsman Michael Stewart in the final.
8–14 August: U.S. Women's Amateur – American Danielle Kang won her second consecutive U.S. Women's Amateur, beating Thailand's Moriya Jutanugarn.
22–28 August: U.S. Amateur – American Kelly Kraft beat countryman Patrick Cantlay, the top ranked amateur, in the final, 2 up.
10–11 September Walker Cup – Great Britain and Ireland defeated the United States, 14 to 12.

Other happenings

World Golf Hall of Fame inductees
On 22 July 2010, the Hall of Fame announced that it would move future induction ceremonies from October/November to May, on the Monday before The Players Championship. The 2011 class was inducted on 9 May:

 Ernie Els (PGA Tour)
 Masashi "Jumbo" Ozaki (International)
 Doug Ford (Veterans)
  Jock Hutchison (Veterans)
 George H. W. Bush (Lifetime Achievement)
 Frank Chirkinian (Lifetime Achievement)

Deaths
1 January – Billy Joe Patton (born 1922), amateur golfer who almost won the 1954 Masters Tournament
20 February – Betty Hicks (born 1920), 1941 U.S. Women's Amateur winner, LPGA co-founder
21 February – Bob Boyd (born 1955), PGA Tour and European Seniors Tour golfer
4 March – Frank Chirkinian (born 1926), American TV producer credited as the "father of televised golf" and 2011 Hall of Fame inductee
8 April – Sam Urzetta (born 1926), 1950 U.S. Amateur winner
18 April – Mason Rudolph (born 1934), five-time PGA Tour winner
7 May – Seve Ballesteros (born 1957), Spanish Hall of Fame golfer; winner of two Masters and three Open Championships
11 July – Alex Hay (born 1933), Scottish golf broadcaster and club pro
24 August – Paul Harney (born 1929), six-time PGA Tour winner
28 August – Cesar Sanudo (born 1943), PGA Tour winner
27 September – Dave Hill (born 1937), 13-time PGA Tour winner
1 October – Sven Tumba (born 1931), Swedish professional golfer, golf course architect, and promoter
14 October – Adam Hunter (born 1963), European Tour winner
3 December – James A. Barclay (born 1923), golf historian, Canadian Golf Hall of Fame member
22 December – Bettye Danoff (born 1923), LPGA co-founder
28 December – Teruo Sugihara (born 1937), 28-time Japan Golf Tour winner

Table of results
This table summarizes all the results referred to above in date order.

The following biennial events will next be played in 2012: Ryder Cup, Curtis Cup, Eisenhower Trophy, Espirito Santo Trophy.

References

 
Golf by year